Inverse transform sampling (also known as inversion sampling, the inverse probability integral transform, the inverse transformation method, Smirnov transform, or the golden rule) is a basic method for pseudo-random number sampling, i.e., for generating sample numbers at random from any probability distribution given its cumulative distribution function.

Inverse transformation sampling takes uniform samples of a number  between 0 and 1, interpreted as a probability, and then returns the smallest number  such that  for the cumulative distribution function  of a random variable.  For example, imagine that  is the standard normal distribution with mean zero and standard deviation one. The table below shows samples taken from the uniform distribution and their representation on the standard normal distribution.

We are randomly choosing a proportion of the area under the curve and returning the number in the domain such that exactly this proportion of the area occurs to the left of that number.  Intuitively, we are unlikely to choose a number in the far end of tails because there is very little area in them which would require choosing a number very close to zero or one.

Computationally, this method involves computing the quantile function of the distribution — in other words, computing the cumulative distribution function (CDF) of the distribution (which maps a number in the domain to a probability between 0 and 1) and then inverting that function. This is the source of the term "inverse" or "inversion" in most of the names for this method. Note that for a discrete distribution, computing the CDF is not in general too difficult: we simply add up the individual probabilities for the various points of the distribution. For a continuous distribution, however, we need to integrate the probability density function (PDF) of the distribution, which is impossible to do analytically for most distributions (including the normal distribution). As a result, this method may be computationally inefficient for many distributions and other methods are preferred; however, it is a useful method for building more generally applicable samplers such as those based on rejection sampling.

For the normal distribution, the lack of an analytical expression for the corresponding quantile function means that other methods (e.g. the Box–Muller transform) may be preferred computationally. It is often the case that, even for simple distributions, the inverse transform sampling method can be improved on: see, for example, the ziggurat algorithm and rejection sampling. On the other hand, it is possible to approximate the quantile function of the normal distribution extremely accurately using moderate-degree polynomials, and in fact the method of doing this is fast enough that inversion sampling is now the default method for sampling from a normal distribution in the statistical package R.

Formal statement

Intuition 
From , we want to generate  with CDF  We assume  to be a continuous, strictly increasing function, which provides good intuition.

We want to see if we can find some strictly monotone transformation , such that . We will have

Therefore, we can generate  from

The method

The problem that the inverse transform sampling method solves is as follows:

Let  be a random variable whose distribution can be described by the cumulative distribution function .

The inverse transform sampling method works as follows:
Generate a random number  from the standard uniform distribution in the interval , i.e. from 
Find the generalized inverse of the desired CDF, i.e. .
 Compute .

Expressed differently, given a cumulative distribution function  and a uniform variable , the random variable  has the distribution .

In the continuous case, a treatment of such inverse functions as objects satisfying differential equations can be given. Some such differential equations admit explicit power series solutions, despite their non-linearity.

Examples 
 As an example, suppose we have a random variable  and a cumulative distribution function
 
 In order to perform an inversion we want to solve for 
 
 From here we would perform steps one, two and three.

By solving y=F(x) we obtain the inverse function
 
 The idea is illustrated in the following graph:

 
 Note that the distribution does not change if we start with 1-y instead of y. For computational purposes, it therefore suffices to generate random numbers y in [0, 1] and then simply calculate

Proof of correctness
Let  be a cumulative distribution function, and let  be its generalized inverse function (using the infimum because CDFs are weakly monotonic and right-continuous):

Claim: If  is a uniform random variable on  then  has  as its CDF.

Proof:

Truncated distribution 

Reduction of the number of inversions 
In order to obtain a large number of samples, one needs to perform the same number of inversions of the distribution. 
One possible way to reduce the number of inversions while obtaining a large number of samples is the application of the so-called Stochastic Collocation Monte Carlo sampler (SCMC sampler) within a polynomial chaos expansion framework. This allows us to generate any number of Monte Carlo samples with only a few inversions of the original distribution with independent samples of a variable for which the inversions are analytically available, for example the standard normal variable.

See also 
 Probability integral transform
 Copula, defined by means of probability integral transform.
 Quantile function, for the explicit construction of inverse CDFs.
 Inverse distribution function for a precise mathematical definition for distributions with discrete components.

References

Monte Carlo methods
Non-uniform random numbers